A duvet cover is a cover for duvet. The duvet cover protects duvet during use.

Duvet covers frequently have a decorative function on the bed, allowing for change of pattern or design for different occasions, or to serve different functions; for example, a heavier duvet cover may be used during colder seasons.

Mass-produced duvet covers are usually made of cotton or a blend of cotton and polyester and can be easily removed to wash at home, while a duvet can be expensive and difficult to clean. Duvet covers may be made from two sheets or panels of cloth sewn together.

References 

Bedding